Joseph Abiodun Balogun, (born January 1, 1955) is a Nigerian-American academic, he is a distinguished professor in the College of Health Sciences at Chicago State University, Illinois and emeritus professor of physiotherapy at University of Medical Sciences, Ondo, Nigeria. He served from 1999 to 2013 as Dean of the College of Health Sciences at Chicago State University (CSU). While at CSU as Dean, Balogun established the HIV/AIDS Research and Policy Institute to address the disproportionate incidence and complex burdens of HIV/AIDS in minority populations.

Education 
Balogun was born in Nigeria and started his early western education at the Kabba Division Joint Education Council Primary School in Idofin and received his Primary School Certificate from the ECWA/SIM Primary School in Makutu, Kogi State, Nigeria. He graduated in 1972 from St. Kizito's College, a Catholic Secondary School (Ordinary level), in Itedo; and in 1973 completed his high school (Advanced level) education at Offa Grammar School. He obtained the Bachelor of Science (Honors) degree in Physiotherapy in 1977 from Nigeria's University at Ibadan. Balogun immigrated to the US in 1980 and earned his master's degree in Orthopedic and Sports Physical Therapy (1981) and Ph.D. in Exercise Physiology with a Minor in Research Methodology from the University of Pittsburgh in 1985. He became a naturalized American citizen in 1998.

Career 
Balogun began his career as a physiotherapist in 1978 at Mubi General Hospital where he was deployed for the mandatory one-year National Youth Service, and established the first Physiotherapy Department in the defunct Gongola State. He joined the Kwara State Civil Service as Basic Physiotherapist in 1979 and worked at the General Hospital in Ilorin until 1980 when he left for his postgraduate education in the USA. Balogun has held faculty, visiting and administrative positions at Russell Sage College; Obafemi Awolowo University (OAU), Ile-Ife; University of Florida, Gainesville; Texas Woman's University, Houston; State University of New York Health Science Center at Brooklyn (SUNY-HSCB); Barry University, Florida; and King Saud University, Saudi Arabia. He served for six years as Chairman of the Physical Therapy Program (1993–1999) and Associate Dean for Student Academic Affairs (1994–1999) at SUNY-HSCB. He also served as Consultant Physiotherapist (1988–1991) and Vice-Dean in the Faculty of Health Sciences at OAU (1990–1991).

Balogun's publications have appeared in journals in Physical Therapy, Ergonomics, and HIV Behavioral Research.  He has authored two books, five book chapters, five monographs/technical compendia, 136 full manuscripts and 59 abstracts/conference proceedings in peer-refereed journals. Among his top research collaborators is Friday Okonofua, Vice-Chancellor of the University of Medical Sciences, Ondo.

In 2015, Balogun delivered the third Christopher Ajao's keynote speech at the 55th Annual Conference of the Nigeria Society of Physiotherapy. In 2017, he gave the second Distinguished University Guest Lecture at the University of Medical Sciences, Ondo City, Nigeria. Balogun serves on the Editorial Board of the International Journal of Physiotherapy Theory and Practice.

Balogun is a Fellow of the Royal Society for Public Health (FRSPH), Fellow of the Academy of Science (FAS),  Fellow of the Nigeria Society of Physiotherapy (FNSP), and Fellow of the American College of Sports Medicine (FACSM). Balogun is the first physical therapist to receive the FAS award.  In 2003, he was awarded the J. Warren Perry Distinguished Author's Award by the Journal of Allied Health.

Personal life 
Balogun is married to Dr. Adetutu Olusola Balogun (Nee Olotu), an occupational therapist and entrepreneur in Tinley Park, Illinois, USA. They have four children.

References 

Nigerian physiotherapists
Fellows of the Nigerian Academy of Science
Okun people
University of Ibadan alumni
Nigerian emigrants to the United States
University of Pittsburgh alumni
Chicago State University faculty
Naturalized citizens of the United States
Academic staff of Obafemi Awolowo University
University of Florida faculty
Russell Sage College faculty
State University of New York faculty
Barry University faculty
Academic staff of King Saud University
1955 births
Living people
Nigerian medical researchers
American physiotherapists
American medical researchers